Rivomarginella is a genus of freshwater snails, gastropod mollusks in the family Marginellidae, the margin snails.

Rivomarginella is the only freshwater genus in the marine family Marginellidae.

Distribution
They are native to Southeast Asia.

Species
There are two species in the genus Rivomarginella:
 Rivomarginella electrum (Reeve, 1865)
 Rivomarginella morrisoni Brandt, 1968 - type species of the genus Rivomarginella

Ecology
Predators of Rivomarginella snails include bagrid catfish false black lancer Bagrichthys macropterus.

References

 Brandt R.A.M. (1974). The non-marine aquatic Mollusca of Thailand. Archiv für Molluskenkunde. 105: i-iv, 1-423.

External links

Marginellidae